The Journal of Cognitive Engineering and Decision Making is a quarterly peer-reviewed academic journal that covers research on human cognition and the application of this to the design and development of system interfaces and automation. Its editor-in-chief is Jan Maarten Schraagen (TNO and University of Twente). It was established in 2007 and is currently published by SAGE Publications in association with the Human Factors and Ergonomics Society.

Abstracting and indexing 
The Journal of Cognitive Engineering and Decision Making is abstracted and indexed in:
 Ergonomics Abstracts
 Transportation Research Information Services
 TRIS Electronic Bibliographic Data Base

Related journals 
 Ergonomics in Design
 Human Factors
 Proceedings of the Human Factors and Ergonomics Society Annual Meeting
 Proceedings of the International Symposium on Human Factors and Ergonomics in Health Care

External links 
 

SAGE Publishing academic journals
English-language journals
Robotics journals
Triannual journals
Publications established in 2007